"Toki no Nagare ni Mi o Makase" (meaning "Give yourself to the flow of Time") is a Japanese song by Taiwanese singer Teresa Teng.

The original Japanese version "Toki no Nagare ni Mi o Makase" was the most popular song in Japan in 1986. It is four minutes and fourteen seconds long, and has a Mandarin version named "I Only Care About You". It was composed by Takashi Miki, with lyrics by Toyohisa Araki. "I Only Care About You" became popular in mainland China after the Cultural Revolution.

The song is well known in Asia and has been recorded by musicians into the 21st century in Taipei and Kuala Lumpur. In a 2010 survey conducted by the Teresa Teng Foundation to determine Teng's most popular hits, "I Only Care About You" received the second-most votes.

References

1986 songs
Teresa Teng songs
Japanese-language songs
Mandarin-language songs
Song articles with missing songwriters